Brian Hart (born 14 July 1959) is a former English  footballer who played as a defender.

References

1959 births
Living people
English footballers
Association football defenders
Rochdale A.F.C. players
English Football League players